Lepidium meyenii, known as maca or Peruvian ginseng, is an edible herbaceous biennial plant of the family Brassicaceae that is native to South America in the high Andes mountains of Peru. It was found at the Meseta de Bombón plateau close to Lake Junin in the late 1980s. It is grown for its fleshy hypocotyl that is fused with a taproot, which is typically dried, but may also be freshly cooked as a root vegetable. As a cash crop, it is primarily exported as a powder that may be raw, or processed further as a gelatinized starch or as an extract. If dried, it may be processed into a flour for baking or as a dietary supplement.

Its Spanish and Quechua names include maca-maca, maino, ayak chichira, and ayak willku.

History and controversy 
Antonio Vázquez de Espinosa gave a description of the plant following his visit to Peru circa 1598 and Bernabé Cobo gave a description of this plant in the early 17th century. Gerhard Walpers named the species Lepidium meyenii in 1843. In the 1990s, Gloria Chacon made a further distinction of a different species. She considered the widely cultivated natural maca of today to be a newer domesticated species, L. peruvianum.

Most botanists doubt this distinction, however, and continue to call the cultivated maca L. meyenii. The Latin name recognized by the USDA similarly continues to be Lepidium meyenii. It has been debated whether it is botanically correct to consider meyenii and peruvianum to be distinct from one another. A 2015 multi-center study found differences in taxonomy, visual appearance, phytochemical profiles and DNA sequences when comparing L. meyenii and L. peruvianum, suggesting that they are in fact different and that their names should not be considered synonyms.

Description
The growth habit, size, and proportions of maca are roughly similar to those of radishes and turnips, to which it is related, but it also resembles a parsnip. The green, fragrant tops are short and lie along the ground. The leaves show a dimorphism according to reproductive stage. They are more prominent in the vegetative phase, and are continuously renewed from the center as the outer leaves die. The off-white, self-fertile flowers are borne on a central raceme, and are followed by  siliculate fruits, each containing two small  reddish-gray ovoid seeds. Seeds are the maca’s only means of reproduction. Maca reproduces mainly through self-pollination and is an autogamous species. The genome consists of 64 chromosomes. From experiments with different day lengths, maca is a short-day plant. Some sources consider the maca to be an annual plant, as in favorable years it can complete a lifecycle within a year.

Root

Maca is the only member of the genus Lepidium with a fleshy hypocotyl, which is fused with the taproot to form a rough inverted pear-shaped body. Maca does vary greatly in the size and shape of the root, which may be triangular, flattened circular, spherical, or rectangular, the latter of which forms the largest roots. Traditionally, native growers have acknowledged four varieties of maca, based on their root color: cream-yellow, half purple, purple, and black; varying levels of anthocyanin is primarily responsible for the color differences.  Maca hypocotyls may be gold or cream, red, purple, blue, black, or green. Each is considered a "genetically unique variety", as seeds of the parent plants grow to have roots of the same color. Specific phenotypes (in maca, 'phenotype' pertains mainly to root color) have been propagated exclusively to increase commercial interest. Cream-colored roots are the most widely grown and are favored in Peru for their enhanced sweetness and size. Black maca is both sweet and slightly bitter in taste.

Cultivation

Growth conditions
Of the cultivated plants, maca is one of the most frost tolerant. Strong winds and sunlight also are characteristics of the native habitat of the maca. Maca today is still mainly cultivated in Peru, in the high Andes of Bolivia, and to a small extent also in Brazil.

Growth

Maca (Peruvian ginseng) seedlings usually emerge about one month after sowing with the onset of the rainy season in October. In the vegetative phase, until May to June, the lower part of the hypocotyl, as well as the upper part of the tap root, grows in size. After 260 to 280 days, it is formed to the harvestable hypocotyl. If the root is left in the soil, it is dormant for two to three months in the time of the cold, dry season until August. Then it will form a generative shoot on which the seeds ripen five months later. One plant is capable of forming up to 1000 tiny seeds, 1600 of which together weigh about one gram. Thus, only relatively few plants are needed for propagation. The plants for cultivation are selected for preferred size and color, then placed 50–100 mm deep in pits with alternate layers of grass and soil to protect them from drying out. They are fertilized heavily, as maca is a soil exhaustive crop. The cultivation cycle is strictly linked to seasonality.

Traditionally, land preparation was done by hand. Nowadays, tractor plowing also is used. As maca grows on sites where no other crops can be cultivated, it is often found after long fallows of sheep grazing pastures. Maca croplands thus traditionally are only fertilized with sheep and alpaca manure; however, fertilizer application could prevent soils from depleting in nutrients.

Weeding or pesticide application usually is not necessary as the climate is not suitable for most weeds or pests. Nearly all maca cultivation in Peru is carried out organically, as maca itself is seldom attacked. Maca is sometimes interplanted with potatoes, as it is known to maca farmers that the plant naturally repels most root crop pests.

Harvest 
The harvest is done manually, with the leaves left in the field as livestock feed or organic fertilizer.

The yield for a cultivated hectare may reach an estimated 15 tons in fresh hypocotyls resulting in around 5 tons of dried material. According to the Ministry of Agriculture of Peru, however, average maca yields for 2005 were only 7 t/ha, with a great variation between different sites.
Although maca has been cultivated outside the Andes, whether it develops the same active constituents or potency outside of its natural habitat is not yet clear. Hypocotyls grown from Peruvian seeds form with difficulty at low elevations, in greenhouses, or in warm climates.

Nutrition

The average composition, on a dry matter basis, is 60-75% carbohydrates (mostly as polysaccharides), 10-14% protein, 8.5% dietary fiber, and 2.2% fats.

Phytochemicals

Maca contains glucotropaeolin, m-methoxyglucotropaeolin, benzyl glucosinolates, polyphenols, (1R,3S)-1-methyl-1,2,3,4-tetrahydro-β-carboline-3-carboxylic acid (MTCA), and p-methoxybenzyl isothiocyanate. Alkamides are also present in maca.

Safety
No pharmacokinetic data have been published for maca. The presence of (1R,3S)-1-methyl-1,2,3,4-tetrahydro-β-carboline-3-carboxylic acid (MTCA) in the extracts of maca indicate a potential safety issue as a monoamine oxidase inhibitor (re. which see β-carboline) and possibility as a mutagen. Due to these potential mutagenic properties of MTCA, the Agency for Sanitary Security in France warned consumers about the possible health risks of powdered maca root, a declaration disputed on the assumption that MTCA would be deactivated by boiling to process maca roots. MTCA-like compounds are associated with craving behaviour.

Marketing
Due to its purported effects on fertility, maca grew in agricultural, commercial, and research interest over the decades of the 1990s to 2014. Market studies showed low acceptance of the particular maca taste by consumers when first exposed to it, creating a barrier for popularity of this food as a culinary vegetable. The economic interest existed more in the perceived, but unproven, health effects of the root's constituents supplied as an extract in a dietary supplement.

By 2014, agricultural and market interest for maca grew in China, but with challenges from Peruvian institutions who accused Chinese companies of illegally exporting maca and of biopiracy, as several Chinese patents had been filed to improve the propagation and genetic diversity of maca.

Uses and preparation
Maca is mainly grown for consumption of its root. The majority of harvested maca is dried. In this form, the hypocotyls can be stored for several years. In Peru, maca is prepared and consumed in various ways, although traditionally it is always cooked. The freshly harvested hypocotyl may be roasted in a pit (called huatia), and is considered a delicacy. Fresh roots usually are available only in the vicinity of the growers. The root can also be mashed and boiled to produce a sweet, thick liquid, then dried and mixed with milk to form a porridge, mazamorra. The cooked roots are also used with other vegetables in empanadas, jams, or soups. The root may be ground to produce a flour for bread, cakes, or pancakes. If fermented, a weak beer called chicha de maca may be produced. In 2010, a U.S.-based brewery, called Andean Brewing Company, became the first company to produce and commercialize beer made from maca under the brand KUKA Beer. From the black morphotype, a liquor is produced. Also, the leaves are edible or may serve as animal fodder. They can be prepared raw in salads or cooked much like L. sativum and L. campestre, to which it is closely related genetically.

The prominent product for export is maca flour, which is a baking flour ground from the hard, dried roots. It is called harina de maca. Maca flour (powder) is a relatively inexpensive bulk commodity, much like wheat flour or potato flour. The supplement industry uses both the dry roots and maca flour for different types of processing and concentrated extracts.  Another common form is maca processed by gelatinization. This extrusion process separates and removes the tough fiber from the roots using gentle heat and pressure, as raw maca is difficult to digest due to its thick fibers.

Archaeological evidence exists for varying degrees of cultivation of maca in the Lake Junin region from around 1700 BC to 1200 AD. Maca has been harvested and used by humans in the puna grasslands of the Andean Mountains for centuries. Contrary to frequent claims that maca's cultivation was common in what is today Peru, until the late 1980s, maca has been cultivated only in a limited area around Lake Junin, in central Peru. Historically, maca often was traded for lowland tropical food staples, such as maize, rice, manioc (tapioca roots), quinoa, and papaya. It also was used as a form of payment of Spanish imperial taxes.

Traditional medicine

Maca has been marketed for its supposed uses in traditional medicine, but there is no high-quality research to indicate it has any effect on health or diseases. A 2016 systematic review found little evidence that it affects semen quality in healthy and infertile men. A 2011 review found no good evidence either for the effectiveness of maca as a treatment for menopausal symptoms in women or for its safety.

References

meyenii
Flora of Peru
Root vegetables
Crops originating from Peru
Plants described in 1843
Medicinal plants of South America